Muchhad Paanwala is a paan shop based in Mumbai. The shop has been featured in the "10 paanwalas in Mumbai you must visit" by Times of India. The shop is a landmark in Kemps Corner, where it is located. It caters to a wide range of customers, including actors and businessmen.  Actor Jackie Shroff is one of the frequent visitors. The shop is currently run by Jaishankar Tiwari, the third generation proprietor from Tiwaripur in Uttar Pradesh. recently Muchhad Paanwala has started new outlets in Nepensea road, Mumbai centre and khetwadi.The Narcotics Control Bureau on 12th Jan 21 held one of the owner Mr. Ramkumar Tiwari in connection with its probe into a drugs case.

History 
The business commenced with Shyama Charan Tiwari who came from Allahabad. He started Muchhad Paanwala venture where the shop stands today. His son Jay Shankar Tiwari followed on his footsteps and took over the business in 1977, with its popularity increasing beyond his expectations.

Products 
The shop offers a variety of paans. The varieties of sweet paans include Kolkata Sweet, Gundi sweet, Magai Sweet, Chocolate Sweet, Special Sweet, Pineapple and Raspberry Sweet.

References

Tourist attractions in Mumbai
Culture of Mumbai